Union Township is one of the thirteen townships of Clinton County, Ohio, United States. The 2010 United States Census reported 3,085 people living in the township. The township surrounds the city of Wilmington, the Clinton County seat. Previous censuses recorded the population of Wilmington as within Union Township, and thus the township population was 14,929 at the 2000 census. The population of 3,008 living in the unincorporated portions of the township in 2000 is comparable to the 2010 entire township population.

Geography
Located at the center of the county, it borders the following townships:
Liberty Township - north
Wilson Township - northeast
Richland Township - east
Wayne Township - southeast corner
Green Township - southeast
Washington Township - south
Vernon Township - southwest corner
Adams Township - west
Chester Township - northwest

The entire township lies in the Virginia Military District.

The city of Wilmington, the county seat of Clinton County, is located in central Union Township.

Name and history
Union Township was established in 1813. It was so named because it was formed from a "union" of land given by Chester, Richland, and Vernon townships.

It is one of twenty-seven Union Townships statewide.

Transportation
Major roads include the 3C Highway (State Route 3 and U.S. Route 22), U.S. Route 68, and State Routes 73 and 134.

Clinton County Air Force Base, a former Air Force Reserve base for a KC-97 refueling unit, an active duty F-101 fighter-interceptor and an active duty U.S. Army Nike missile battalion, was turned into the Wilmington Airport, a hub for Airborne Express, now DHL.  It is now known as Airborne Airpark and is located just east of Wilmington in the township.

Government
The township is governed by a three-member board of trustees, who are elected in November of odd-numbered years to a four-year term beginning on the following January 1. Two are elected in the year after the presidential election and one is elected in the year before it. There is also an elected township fiscal officer, who serves a four-year term beginning on April 1 of the year after the election, which is held in November of the year before the presidential election. Vacancies in the fiscal officership or on the board of trustees are filled by the remaining trustees.

References
Clinton County Historical Society. Clinton County, Ohio, 1982. Wilmington, Ohio: The Society, 1982.
Ohio Atlas & Gazetteer. 6th ed. Yarmouth, Maine: DeLorme, 2001. 
Ohio. Secretary of State. The Ohio municipal and township roster, 2002-2003. Columbus, Ohio: The Secretary, 2003.

External links
County website

Townships in Clinton County, Ohio
Townships in Ohio